Bonamici is an Italian surname. Notable people with the surname include:

 Filippo Bonamici alias Fil Bo Riva (born 1992), Italian musician
 Suzanne Bonamici (born 1954), American politician

See also
 Bonamico (disambiguation)
 Buonamici

Italian-language surnames